The 2004 FINA Women's Water Polo World League was the initial edition of an annual tournament organized by the International Swimming Federation (FINA). The tournament was held in Long Beach, California from June 23 to June 27, 2004.

Preliminary round

Group A

Group B

Knockout stage

5th–8th Places

Final ranking

Individual awards
Top Scorer
 — 12 goals
 — 12 goals

References

Sports123.com

World League, women
2004
International water polo competitions hosted by the United States